Jane X. Luu (born July 1963) is a Vietnamese-American astronomer and defense systems engineer. She was awarded the Kavli Prize (shared with David C. Jewitt and Michael Brown) for 2012 "for discovering and characterizing the Kuiper Belt and its largest members, work that led to a major advance in the understanding of the history of our planetary system".

Luu immigrated to the United States as a refugee in 1975, when the South Vietnamese government fell. She and her family lived in refugee camps and motels before they settled in Kentucky, where she had relatives. She graduated from high school as valedictorian and then earned a scholarship to Stanford University, receiving her bachelor's degree in physics in 1984. Working at the Jet Propulsion Laboratory at NASA after college inspired her to study astronomy.

Work as a graduate student and co-discovery of the Kuiper Belt 

As a graduate student at the University of California at Berkeley and the Massachusetts Institute of Technology, she looked at links between asteroids and comets for her main PhD project. She also worked with David C. Jewitt to discover the Kuiper Belt, an area previously believed to contain no objects. In 1992, after five years of observation, they found the first known Kuiper Belt object other than Pluto and its largest moon Charon, using the University of Hawaii's 2.2 meter telescope on Mauna Kea.  This object is (15760) 1992 QB1, which she and Jewitt nicknamed "Smiley". The American Astronomical Society awarded Luu the Annie J. Cannon Award in Astronomy in 1991. In 1992, Luu received a Hubble Fellowship from the Space Telescope Science Institute and chose the University of California, Berkeley as a host institution. The Phocaea main-belt asteroid 5430 Luu is named in her honor. She received her PhD in 1992 at MIT.

Professional life 

After receiving her doctorate, Luu worked as an assistant professor at Harvard University, since 1994. Luu also served as a professor at Leiden University in the Netherlands.  Following her time in Europe, Luu returned to the United States and worked on instrumentation as a Senior Scientist at Lincoln Laboratory at MIT, focusing on defense-industry projects, specifically lidar systems.

In December 2004, Luu and Jewitt reported the discovery of crystalline water ice on Quaoar, which was at the time the largest known Kuiper Belt object. They also found indications of ammonia hydrate.  Their report theorized that the ice likely formed underground, becoming exposed after a collision with another Kuiper Belt object sometime in the last few million years.

In 2012, she won (along with David C. Jewitt of the University of California at Los Angeles) the Shaw Prize "for their discovery and characterization of trans-Neptunian bodies, an archeological treasure dating back to the formation of the solar system and the long-sought source of short period comets" 
and the Kavli Prize (shared with Jewitt and Michael E. Brown) "for discovering and characterizing the Kuiper Belt and its largest members, work that led to a major advance in the understanding of the history of our planetary system".

Personal life 

Luu enjoys traveling, and has worked for Save the Children in Nepal.  She enjoys a variety of outdoor activities and plays the cello. She met her husband, Ronnie Hoogerwerf, who is also an astronomer, while working in the Netherlands in a tenured position at Leiden University. They have one child together.

Honors, awards and accolades 
 1991 Annie J. Cannon Award in Astronomy
 2012 Shaw Prize in Astronomy 
 2012 Kavli Prize in Astrophysics 
 The asteroid 5430 Luu was named in her honor on 1 July 1996.
 She is a fellow of the Norwegian Academy of Science and Letters.

Selected publications 
 NASA Astrophysics Data System publication listing, Over 200 publications are listing
 

 Crystalline Ice on Kuiper Belt Object (50000) Quaoar (article co-written with David Jewitt, published in the December 9, 2004 issue of Nature)
 The Shape Distribution of Kuiper Belt Objects (paper co-written with Pedro Lacerda, June 2003)
 Comet Impact on McMaster (presentation summary, November 2001)
 Accretion in the Early Kuiper Belt I. Coagulation and Velocity Evolution (paper co-written with Scott J. Kenyon, published in May 1998 Astronomical Journal)
 Optical and Infrared Reflectance Spectrum of Kuiper Belt Object 1996 TL66 (paper co-written with D.C. Jewitt, January 1998)

References

External links 

 No Starry Eyed Astronomer.  Vijaysree  Venkatraman (October 2012)

1963 births
20th-century American astronomers
21st-century American women scientists
21st-century American astronomers
Discoverers of asteroids
Discoverers of trans-Neptunian objects

Recipients of the Annie J. Cannon Award in Astronomy
Academics of Vietnamese descent
Harvard University faculty
Hubble Fellows
Academic staff of Leiden University
Living people
Members of the Norwegian Academy of Science and Letters
People from Ho Chi Minh City
Planetary scientists
Women astronomers
Vietnamese astronomers
Vietnamese emigrants to the United States
MIT Lincoln Laboratory people
Kavli Prize laureates in Astrophysics
Women planetary scientists
20th-century American women
American women academics